Mohinder Lal (born 24 February 1947) is an Indian sports shooter. He competed in the men's 25 metre rapid fire pistol event at the 1984 Summer Olympics.

References

1947 births
Living people
Indian male sport shooters
Olympic shooters of India
Shooters at the 1984 Summer Olympics
Place of birth missing (living people)
Shooters at the 1990 Asian Games
Commonwealth Games medallists in shooting
Commonwealth Games silver medallists for India
Recipients of the Arjuna Award
Shooters at the 1982 Commonwealth Games
Asian Games competitors for India
20th-century Indian people
Medallists at the 1982 Commonwealth Games